Raymond of Turenne may refer to:

Raymond I of Turenne, 7th Viscount of Turenne
Raymond II of Turenne, 9th Viscount of Turenne
Raymond III of Turenne, 10th Viscount of Turenne
Raymond IV of Turenne, 11th Viscount of Turenne
Raymond VIII of Turenne, 20th Viscount of Turenne; see La Tour-d'Aigues